The Coronation Cup was a one-off football tournament to celebrate the Coronation of Queen Elizabeth II, between four English and four Scottish clubs, held in Glasgow in May 1953. This tournament, like the Empire Exhibition Trophy, was held in very high regard by football clubs, as at the time it allowed teams to test themselves against teams from another country in the days before European football.

Celtic and Hibernian met in the final at Hampden Park, Celtic coming out the winners 2–0 before 117,000 spectators. Celtic's victory meant that they became the unofficial champions of Britain.

Entrants

Quarter-finals
 Celtic 1 – 0  Arsenal
 Manchester United 2 – 1  Rangers
 Newcastle United 4 – 0  Aberdeen
 Hibernian 1 – 1 (a.e.t.)  Tottenham Hotspur

Replay
 Hibernian 2 – 1 (a.e.t.)  Tottenham Hotspur

Semi-finals
 Celtic 2 – 1  Manchester United
 Hibernian 4 – 0  Newcastle United

Final

|}

See also
1888 Glasgow Exhibition Cup, similar tournament in 1888
Glasgow International Exhibition Cup, similar tournament in 1901
Edinburgh Exhibition Cup, similar tournament in 1908
Empire Exhibition Trophy, similar tournament in 1938
Saint Mungo Cup, similar tournament in 1951

References

Scottish football friendly trophies
Defunct football cup competitions in Scotland
1952–53 in English football
1952–53 in Scottish football
International club association football competitions hosted by Scotland
International sports competitions in Glasgow
Football in Glasgow
1950s in Glasgow
May 1953 sports events in the United Kingdom
Coronation of Elizabeth II